2006 Malta Open is a darts tournament, which took place in Malta in 2006.

Results

References

2006 in darts
2006 in Maltese sport
Darts in Malta